Alone Together may refer to:

Music

Albums
 Alone Together (Benny Carter album), 1956
 Alone Together (Tony Bennett album), 1961
 Alone Together (Dave Mason album), 1970
 Alone Together (Ron Carter and Jim Hall album), 1972
 Alone Together (Donny Osmond album), 1973
 Alone Together (Clare Fischer album), 1977
 Alone Together: The Best of the Mercury Years, a 1995 album by Clifford Brown and Max Roach
 Alone Together (Lee Konitz album), 1996
 Alone Together (Gary Williams album), 2004
 Alone Together (Quidam album), 2007
 Alone Together (Catherine Russell album), 2019
 Alone Together (Daley EP), 2012
 Alone Together (Pat Martino album), 2012
 Alone Together, a 2012 album by Karriem Riggins

Songs
 "Alone Together" (1932 song), a 1932 song by Arthur Schwartz and Howard Dietz
 "Alone, Together", a song from The Strokes' 2001 debut album Is This It
 "Alone, Together", a song from Infernal's 2010 album Fall from Grace
 "Alone Together", a 2012 song by British singer-songwriter Daley
 "Alone Together" (Fall Out Boy song), 2013

Other uses
 Alone Together, a 2011 book by Sherry Turkle
 Alone Together (TV series), an American comedy series on Freeform
 "Alone Together" (Steven Universe), an episode of Steven Universe
 Alone/Together, 2019 Philippine film
 Charli XCX: Alone Together, a 2021 documentary about Charli XCX
 Alone Together (2022 film), a film by Katie Holmes 
 Alone Together (1990 film), a Spanish spy thriller film